The 1876 United States presidential election in Nevada took place on November 7, 1876, as part of the 1876 United States presidential election. Voters chose three representatives, or electors to the Electoral College, who voted for president and vice president.

Nevada voted for the Republican nominee, Rutherford B. Hayes, over the Democratic nominee, Samuel J. Tilden. Hayes won the state by a margin of 5.46%.

Results

See also
United States presidential elections in Nevada

References

Nevada
1876
1876 Nevada elections